Welsh Gymnastics (WG) (founded 1902 as the Welsh Amateur Gymnastics Association) is the national governing body for gymnastics in Wales. It has overall responsibility for the administration of all eight gymnastics disciplines in Wales – women's artistic, men's artistic and rhythmic gymnastics, general gymnastics, sports acrobatics, sports aerobics, trampolining and tumbling – through its four geographical areas (north, south, east and west), which are responsible for their own area competition and squad training sessions.

Welsh Gymnastics organises the Welsh national and international teams and competitions.

Welsh Gymnastics relocated their headquarters from Cardiff Central Youth Club, East Moors, Cardiff to the Sport Wales National Centre, Sophia Gardens, Cardiff in 2010.

References

Gym
Gymnastics organizations
Organisations based in Cardiff
Gymnastics in the United Kingdom
2004 establishments in Wales
Gymnastics in Wales